Planaterga is a clade of prosomapod euchelicerates including several synziphosurid genera (mainly bunodids and pseudoniscids) and the group Dekatriata (which in turn includes arachnids, chasmataspidids and eurypterids). Planaterga is defined by the opisthosoma with tergites broadest at third or fourth and lacking enlarged axial nodes, carapace (prosomal dorsal shield) with reduced genal spines, as well as somite VII (first opisthosomal segment) with reduced appendages and microtergite.

References 

 
Middle Ordovician first appearances